Tengah Island is a privately owned island in Mersing District, Johor, Malaysia. It is located nine nautical miles off the coast of Mersing on the South China Sea.

Tengah Island is 16 km off the coast of Besar Island, and is a 45-minute boat ride away. During the 1970s, the island became famous as a Vietnamese refugee transit campsite, which was subsequently closed in the early 1980s.

The island was the first location for the filming of the TV show Expedition Robinson in 1997.

In 1985, Tengah Island was one of a few islands nominated by the Malaysian government as a Marine Park.

The island is home to a resort called Batu Batu. The resort runs a conservation program called Turtle Watch Camp. Marine biologists working with Turtle Watch Camp have built a hatchery to preserve sea turtle eggs until they hatch.

See also
 List of islands of Malaysia

References

Islands of Johor
Mersing District
Uninhabited islands of Malaysia
Private islands of Malaysia